Lamps Plus, Inc. is a privately held corporation that designs, manufactures, and sells portable lighting, fixture lighting, furniture, home décor items and a variety of other related products. Its worldwide headquarters is located in the Chatsworth district of the San Fernando Valley region of the city of Los Angeles, California.

Background
The company was founded in 1976 in Los Angeles by CEO Dennis Swanson and Co-Owner Manja Swanson. The first store was located in North Hollywood, California, and was both a manufacturing and a retail space. From lamp design and manufacture, the company moved into retail and is now a full omni-channel retailer and the largest specialty lighting company in the United States. Lamps Plus opened its corporate headquarters in Chatsworth, California. Lamps Plus maintains a professional trade division, a hospitality division, a distribution center and, in 2004, its website was picked as one of the top 50 retail websites by Internet Retailer magazine. The company has made the top 200 of the list every year it has been published. The company was the first U.S. retailer to offer the option for customers to text store associates with inquiries without requiring an app. The company and Dennis Swanson hold several patents for lighting design, including a torchiere floor lamp design with two adjustable side lights and a lamp having a low light level replaceable bulb. Dennis Swanson has also served as past President of the American Lighting Association. 

Originally the company was called Lamps R Us but had to change it on a request from Toys "Я" Us.

In 2016, the company had a data breach of employee data which led to a class action lawsuit. In Lamps Plus, Inc. v. Varela, the U.S. Supreme court ruled that the company could compel the employees to settle through individual arbitration based on their employment contract.

Products 

 In 2012, the company began selling its Color Plus collection lamps. These custom manufactured products are offered in more than 100 color choices. 
July 2020: Lamps Plus also launched a new range of lighting fixtures that provide customers with a variety of unique style designs on metal pendant lights and chandeliers. The line Giclee Gallery uses concept wraps on metal fixtures.
March 2021: Lamps Plus began exclusively selling Stiffel branded lighting fixtures. Stiffel is an American luxury lamp company that began in 1932.

Partnerships 
The company has worked with a number of industry designers and personalities, including industrial pattern designer Stacy Garcia, Kathy Ireland, furniture and lighting designer Sergio Orozco, lighting designer Robert Sonneman, Romero Britto and the Los Angeles pop artist, Ragnar.

In 2017, the company began an annual endorsement partnership with NFL offensive lineman Forrest Lamp. This included releasing the athlete’s first signature lamp, the Forrest Lamp, in 2020.

Awards and recognition

2004 Internet Retailer Best of the Web Top 50 Retailing Sites
2006 Inductee to the Lighting Hall of Fame – Dennis K. Swanson
2007 Internet Retailer Top 500 Retail Web Sites
2019 eTail Best-in-Class Awards, Best Omni-Channel Retailer
2019 CommerceNexty Awards, Best Use of a New Channel

Patents

References

External links
Official Lamps Plus website

Lighting brands
Manufacturing companies based in Los Angeles
Retail companies of the United States
Chatsworth, Los Angeles
American companies established in 1976
Design companies established in 1976
Manufacturing companies established in 1976
Retail companies established in 1976
1976 establishments in California